Yevgeny Borisovich Grishin (born 1 October 1959) is a retired Russian water polo defender. He was part of the Soviet teams that won gold medals at the 1980 Olympics, 1982 World Championships and 1983 and 1985 European championships and placed third at the 1986 World Championships and 1988 Olympics. Grishin was coached by his father Boris, who is also a retired Olympic water polo defender. His mother Valentina and sister Yelena are Olympic fencers.

See also
 Soviet Union men's Olympic water polo team records and statistics
 List of Olympic champions in men's water polo
 List of Olympic medalists in water polo (men)
 List of World Aquatics Championships medalists in water polo

References

External links

 

1959 births
Living people
Russian male water polo players
Olympic water polo players of the Soviet Union
Water polo players at the 1980 Summer Olympics
Water polo players at the 1988 Summer Olympics
Olympic gold medalists for the Soviet Union
Olympic bronze medalists for the Soviet Union
Olympic medalists in water polo
Medalists at the 1988 Summer Olympics
Medalists at the 1980 Summer Olympics
Sportspeople from Moscow